Kjell Øyasæther (born 8 February 1950) is a Norwegian former footballer who played as a forward. He played 80 league matches for Rosenborg in 1969 and between 1975 and 1977, and 77 league matches for Brann between 1970 and 1971. Øyasæther became Rosenborg's top scorer in the 1977 season, with three goals.

References

1950 births
Living people
Norwegian footballers
Association football forwards
Rosenborg BK players
SK Brann players
Eliteserien players